Carlo Orlandi (23 April 1910 – 29 July 1983) was an Italian boxer who won a gold medal at the 1928 Olympics. In 1929 Orlandi turned professional.  During the 1930s Orlandi held both the Italian and European lightweight titles. He then won the Italian welterweight title in 1941 and retired in 1944. Orlandi was deaf.

Olympic boxing record
Here is the Olympic boxing record of Carlo Orlandi, who competed for Italy in the lightweight division of the 1928 Olympic boxing tournament:

 Round of 32: bye
 Round of 16: defeated Roberto Sanz of Spain by decision
 Quarterfinal: defeated Cecil Bissett of Rhodesia by a first-round knockout
 Semifinal: defeated Hans Jacob Nielsen of Denmark by decision
 Final: defeated Stephen Halaiko of the United States by decision (won gold medal)

References

1910 births
1983 deaths
Boxers from Milan
Lightweight boxers
Olympic boxers of Italy
Boxers at the 1928 Summer Olympics
Olympic gold medalists for Italy
Deaf martial artists
Olympic medalists in boxing
Italian male boxers
Medalists at the 1928 Summer Olympics
Italian deaf people
20th-century Italian people